The genus Sporobolus contains about 160 species.

A
 Sporobolus acinifolius Stapf
 Sporobolus actinocladus (F.Muell.) F.Muell.
 Sporobolus acuminatus (Trin.) Hack.
 Sporobolus adustus (Trin.) Roseng.
 Sporobolus aeneus (Trin.) Kunth
 Sporobolus africanus (Poir.) Robyns & Tournay
 Sporobolus agrostoides Chiov.
 Sporobolus airiformis Chiov.
 Sporobolus airoides (Torr.) Torr.
 Sporobolus albicans (Nees ex Trin.) Nees
 Sporobolus aldabrensis Renvoize
 Sporobolus amaliae Veldkamp
 Sporobolus anglicus P.M.Peterson & Saarela
 Sporobolus angustifolius A.Rich.
 Sporobolus apiculatus Boechat & Longhi-Wagner
 Sporobolus atrovirens (Kunth) Kunth
 Sporobolus australasicus Domin

B
 Sporobolus bahamensis Hack.
 Sporobolus balansae Henrard
 Sporobolus bechuanicus Gooss.
 Sporobolus blakei B.K.Simon
 Sporobolus bogotensis Swallen & García-Barr.
 Sporobolus bosseri A.Camus
 Sporobolus brockmanii Stapf
 Sporobolus buckleyi Vasey

C
 Sporobolus caespitosus Kunth
 Sporobolus camporum Swallen
 Sporobolus capillaris Miq.
 Sporobolus caroli Mez
 Sporobolus centrifugus (Trin.) Nees
 Sporobolus clandestinus (Biehler) Hitchc.
 Sporobolus coahuilensis J.Valdés
 Sporobolus collettii (Hook.f.) Bor
 Sporobolus compactus Clayton
 Sporobolus compositus (Poir.) Merr.
 Sporobolus confinis (Steud.) Chiov.
 Sporobolus congoensis Franch.
 Sporobolus consimilis Fresen.
 Sporobolus contiguus S.T.Blake
 Sporobolus contractus Hitchc.
 Sporobolus copei Verloove
 Sporobolus cordofanus (Hochst. ex Steud.) Hérincq ex Coss.
 Sporobolus coromandelianus (Retz.) Kunth
 Sporobolus creber De Nardi
 Sporobolus crucensis Renvoize
 Sporobolus cryptandrus (Torr.) A.Gray
 Sporobolus cubensis Hitchc.
 Sporobolus curtissii Small ex Kearney

D
 Sporobolus diandrus (Retz.) P.Beauv.
 Sporobolus dinklagei Mez
 Sporobolus discosporus Nees
 Sporobolus disjunctus B.K.Simon
 Sporobolus distichivaginatus R.W.Pohl
 Sporobolus domingensis (Trin.) Kunth
 †Sporobolus durus Brongn. (extinct)

E
 Sporobolus elatior Bosser
 Sporobolus elongatus R.Br.
 Sporobolus engleri Pilg.
 Sporobolus erectus Hitchc.
 Sporobolus eximius (Trin.) Ekman

F
 Sporobolus farinosus Hosok.
 Sporobolus fertilis (Steud.) Clayton
 Sporobolus festivus Hochst. ex A.Rich.
 Sporobolus fibrosus Cope
 Sporobolus fimbriatus (Nees ex Trin.) Nees
 Sporobolus flexuosus (Thurb. ex Vasey) Rydb.
 Sporobolus floridanus Chapm.
 Sporobolus fourcadei Stent

G
 Sporobolus geminatus Clayton
 Sporobolus giganteus Nash
 Sporobolus gloeoclados Cope

H
 Sporobolus hajrae P.Umam. & P.Daniel
 Sporobolus halophilus Bosser
 Sporobolus hancei Rendle
 Sporobolus harmandii Henrard
 Sporobolus helvolus (Trin.) T.Durand & Schinz
 Sporobolus heterolepis (A.Gray) A.Gray
 Sporobolus hians Van Schaack
 Sporobolus hintonii W.Hartley
 Sporobolus humilis J.Presl

I
 Sporobolus indicus (L.) R.Br.
 Sporobolus infirmus Mez
 Sporobolus interruptus Vasey
 Sporobolus ioclados (Nees ex Trin.) Nees
 Sporobolus ivakoanyensis A.Camus

J
 Sporobolus jacquemontii Kunth 
 Sporobolus junceus (P. Beauv.) Kunth

K
 Sporobolus kerrii Bor

L
 Sporobolus lanuginellus Maire
 Sporobolus lasiophyllus Pilg.
 Sporobolus latzii B.K.Simon
 Sporobolus laxus B.K.Simon
 Sporobolus lenticularis S.T.Blake
 Sporobolus linearifolius Nicora
 Sporobolus ludwigii Hochst.

M
 Sporobolus macer (Trin.) Hitchc.
 Sporobolus macranthelus Chiov.
 Sporobolus macrospermus Scribn. ex Beal
 Sporobolus maderaspatanus Bor
 Sporobolus maximus Hauman
 Sporobolus mendocinus Méndez
 Sporobolus metallicola Longhi-Wagner & Boechat
 Sporobolus micranthus (Steud.) T.Durand & Schinz
 Sporobolus microprotus Stapf
 Sporobolus mildbraedii Pilg.
 Sporobolus minarum Boechat & Longhi-Wagner
 Sporobolus minimus Cope
 Sporobolus minor Kunth
 Sporobolus minutus Link
 Sporobolus mirabilis Pilg.
 Sporobolus mitchellii (Trin.) C.E.Hubb.
 Sporobolus molleri Hack.
 Sporobolus monandrus Roseng., B.R.Arrill. & Izag.
 Sporobolus montanus Engl.
 Sporobolus mopane Cope
 Sporobolus multinodis Hack.
 Sporobolus multiramosus Longhi-Wagner & Boechat
 Sporobolus myrianthus Benth.

N
 Sporobolus natalensis (Steud.) T.Durand & Schinz
 Sporobolus nealleyi Vasey
 Sporobolus nebulosus Hack.
 Sporobolus neglectus Nash
 Sporobolus nervosus Hochst.
 Sporobolus nitens Stent
 Sporobolus novoguineensis Baaijens
 Sporobolus nudiramus Boechat & Longhi-Wagner

O
 Sporobolus olivaceus Napper
 Sporobolus oxyphyllus Fish

P
 Sporobolus palmeri Scribn.
 Sporobolus pamelae B.K.Simon
 Sporobolus panicoides A.Rich.
 Sporobolus paniculatus (Trin.) T.Durand & Schinz
 Sporobolus partimpatens B.K.Simon
 Sporobolus pauciflorus A.Chev.
 Sporobolus paucifolius Boechat & Longhi-Wagner
 Sporobolus pectinatus Hack.
 Sporobolus pectinellus Mez
 Sporobolus pellucidus Hochst.
 Sporobolus perrieri A.Camus
 Sporobolus phleoides Hack. ex Stuck.
 Sporobolus pilifer (Trin.) Kunth
 Sporobolus pinetorum Weakley & P.M.Peterson
 Sporobolus platensis Parodi
 Sporobolus potosiensis Wipff & S.D.Jones
 Sporobolus pseudairoides Parodi
 Sporobolus pulchellus R.Br.
 Sporobolus pungens (Schreb.) Kunth
 Sporobolus purpurascens (Sw.) Ham.
 Sporobolus pyramidalis P.Beauv.
 Sporobolus pyramidatus (Lam.) A.S.Hitchc.

Q
 Sporobolus quadratus Clayton

R
 Sporobolus recurvatus Boechat & Longhi-Wagner
 Sporobolus reflexus Boechat & Longhi-Wagner
 Sporobolus rhizomatosus (Steud.) T.Durand & Schinz
 Sporobolus rigens (Tr.) Desv.
 Sporobolus rigidifolius (Trin.) Mez ex Veldkamp
 Sporobolus robustus Kunth
 Sporobolus ruspolianus Chiov.

S
 Sporobolus salsus Mez
 Sporobolus sanguineus Rendle
 Sporobolus scabridus S.T.Blake
 Sporobolus sciadocladus Ohwi
 Sporobolus scitulus Clayton
 Sporobolus sessilis B.K.Simon
 Sporobolus silveanus Swallen
 Sporobolus somalensis Chiov.
 Sporobolus spicatus Kunth – salt grass
 Sporobolus spiciformis Swallen
 Sporobolus splendens Swallen
 Sporobolus stapfianus
 Sporobolus stolzii Mez
 Sporobolus subglobosus A.Chev.
 Sporobolus subtilis Kunth
 Sporobolus subulatus Hack.

T
 Sporobolus temomairemensis Judz. & P.M.Peterson
 Sporobolus tenellus (A.Spreng.) Kunth
 Sporobolus tenuissimus (Mart. ex Schrank) Kuntze
 Sporobolus teretifolius R.M.Harper
 Sporobolus testudinum Renvoize
 Sporobolus tetragonus Bor
 Sporobolus texanus Vasey
 Sporobolus tourneuxii Coss.
 Sporobolus trichodes Hitchc.
 Sporobolus tsiafajavonensis A.Camus

U
 Sporobolus uniglumis Stent & J.M.Rattray

V
 Sporobolus vaginiflorus (Torr. ex A.Gray) Alph.Wood
 Sporobolus virginicus (L.) Kunth.
 Sporobolus viscidus Sohns

W
 Sporobolus wallichii Munro ex Thwaites
 Sporobolus welwitschii Rendle
 Sporobolus wrightii Munro ex Scribn.

References

Sporobolus